Elly Rono (born May 5, 1970) is a former Kenyan long-distance runner. Rono attended the University of Southern Indiana where he was an NCAA Division II champion in cross country, the indoor 5,000 metres, and the outdoor 10,000 metres. He is a two-time winner of the California International Marathon.

Achievements

References

External links
 

1970 births
Living people
Kenyan male long-distance runners
University of Southern Indiana alumni